Alejandro Marcelo Russo (born 13 February 1968) is an Argentine former professional footballer who played as a forward for Estudiantes de La Plata and Argentinos Juniors, among other clubs. He also represented Argentina at the 1988 Summer Olympics in Seoul. He made two appearances in the competition. In October 1990, he went on trial at Manchester United, for whom he made two reserve team appearances.

External links
Paso efímero: Alejandro RUSSO 
"Es muy importante lo presencia de Sebastián Verón en Estudiantes"

1968 births
Living people
Sportspeople from Buenos Aires Province
Argentine footballers
Association football forwards
Estudiantes de La Plata footballers
Argentinos Juniors footballers
Footballers at the 1988 Summer Olympics
Olympic footballers of Argentina
Pan American Games bronze medalists for Argentina
Medalists at the 1987 Pan American Games
Footballers at the 1987 Pan American Games
Pan American Games medalists in football